Red Zebra is a Belgian post-punk group from Bruges.

They started at the end of the 1970s and have the following members: Peter Slabbynck (vocals), Geert Maertens (lead guitar), Vincent Hallez (second guitar and bass guitar) and Johan Isselee (drums). In 1980 they had their biggest hit I Can't Live In A Living room, today still a punk classic. The group still exists and also has a related project today, namely The John Lennon Rifle Club. On 6 December 2010, it was announced that the cooperation between singer Peter Slabbynck and the other members of the group was stopped. They announced this on their page on Myspace. In 2017 they reformed.

Their song "I Can't Live in a Living Room" was used in Asia Argento's 2014 film Incompresa (English title Misunderstood).

Discography 
 I Can't Live In A Living Room
 TV Activity
 Bastogne
 Lust
 Polar Club
 Maquis
 Always
 From Ape To Zebra (Parsifal)
 A Red Zebra Is Not A Dead Zebra
 Sanitized For Your Protection
 Mimicry
 John Wayne
 Last Band Standing
 Don't Put Your Head In A Bucket (Parsifal)
 Punks Don't Have Barbecues
 Blue Nothing Day
 The Art Of Conversation
 Kookaburra
 Spit On The City
 I Got The Microphone
 Live In Front Of A Nation
 No Kitchen In The House
 Graveyard Shuffle

References

External links 
Myspace

Belgian rock music groups
Culture in Bruges